Xanthoparmelia semiviridis, also known as resurrection lichen is a foliose lichen species in the family Parmeliaceae. Its common name comes from the reaction of a dry sample to moisture. In its dry state it appears like curled-up dry leaf litter on the ground, but after rainfall the lichen will quickly recover, unfurl and become darker in colour.  It is found in semi-arid areas across southern Australia and the South Island of New Zealand. The species is in decline in New Zealand because of the loss of habitat resulting from the establishment of dairy farms and vineyards in former indigenous habitat, and the deterioration of existing habitat caused by invasive species such as hawkweeds.

Taxonomy 
It was first formally described as a new species in 1863 by Ferdinand von Mueller and given the name Parmeliopsis semiviridis, based on a specimen collected by Robert Brown from Table Mountain, Australia. It was moved in 1879 to the genus Chondropsis by James Crombie, before being placed in Xanthoparmelia in a 2004 revision of the genus based on DNA. Its specific epithet, "semiviridis", is from the Latin semi (half or partially) and viridis (green).

Description
X. semiviridis is a rare exception amongst Xanthoparmelia species in that it grows unattached to any substrate. The thalli have no rhizines to anchor its lower surface. When it becomes wet, the ball unrolls and changes to a foliose form with dichotomous branches, and becomes darker in colour. Although it rarely fruits, specimens with mature and immature fruits are occasionally seen.

Distribution
X. semiviridis is found in regions across the south of Australia from Western Australia to New South Wales, in semi-arid areas where there is some winter rainfall. It is also found in the South Island of New Zealand, in the Molesworth area (Marlborough region), the Balmoral and Mackenzie Country area of Canterbury, and also in Central Otago.

Conservation status 
X. semiviridis is classified as "At Risk - Declining" by the New Zealand Department of Conservation. The species is in decline in New Zealand because of the loss of habitat resulting from the establishment of dairy farms and vineyards in former indigenous habitat, and the deterioration of existing habitat caused by invasive species such as hawkweeds (Pilosella spp.).

See also
List of Xanthoparmelia species

References

Further reading

External links

 Resurrection lichen discussed on RNZ Critter of the Week on 17 June 2022
 Xanthoparmelia semiviridis occurrence data & images at GBIF
 Xanthoparmelia semiviridis at the New Zealand Plant Conservation Network
 Xanthoparmelia semiviridis at the Australian Biological Resources Study
 Vagrant lichens at the Australian National Botanic Gardens
 Wandering lichen at malleeconservation.com.au

semiviridis
Lichen species
Lichens described in 1863
Lichens of New Zealand
Lichens of Australia